Tropical Cyclone Steve was a tropical cyclone that affected northern Australia from 27 February 2000 until 11 March 2000. Cyclone Steve was noted for its longevity and traversal of northern and western Australia. It impacted on regions of northern Queensland, the Northern Territory and Western Australia before clearing to the south of the continent. Steve is the first known Australian cyclone to make four distinct landfalls in the country.

Meteorological history

A tropical low formed in the Coral Sea to the east of Willis Island on 25 February 2000. The system rapidly intensified to become Tropical Cyclone Steve at around 7 am Australian Eastern Standard Time (AEST) (UTC+10) on 27 February 2000. The cyclone crossed the Queensland coast as a Category 2 system on 27 February to the north of Cairns at around 7 pm AEST. Steve weakened slowly over land and was downgraded to a tropical low on 28 February.

The low tracked westward and re-intensified to tropical cyclone strength over the Gulf of Carpentaria on the same day at around 10 pm AEST. The cyclone passed over Mornington Island in the southern Gulf of Carpentaria and crossed the Northern Territory coast north of Port McArthur on 1 March as a Category 1. The cyclone weakened back to a tropical low again, but maintained a strong low to middle-level circulation as it crossed the base of the Top End of the Northern Territory. The low moved just south of the Joseph Bonaparte Gulf into the Kimberley region of Western Australia and reformed once again into a tropical cyclone just west of Broome on 5 March at 1 pm Australian Western Standard Time (AWST) (UTC+8).

Cyclone Steve moved in a west southwest direction parallel to the Pilbara coast and strengthened further during the day and was upgraded to a Category 2 system early on 6 March. The cyclone deepened to a pressure of 975 hPa during the day. Continuing on its path to the southwest, Steve passed north of Port Hedland and Karratha on 6 March, before crossing the Pilbara coast near Mardie around midnight on 6 March (Steve's third landfall). The system was again downgraded to Category 1 as it moved inland.

However, the system did not intensify further beyond Category 1 and made its final (fourth) landfall at around midnight on 9 March east of Denham. Steve then continued to track to the south-east and increased in speed across southern parts of Western Australia during the 10 and 11 March and becoming extra-tropical, before moving offshore for the final time to the east of Esperance late on 11 March and over the waters of the Great Australian Bight.

Impact

Queensland
As Steve tracked inland on the north Queensland coast, it caused major flooding between Cairns and Mareeba. Many buildings in Cairns suffered severe water damage including the Cairns Hospital. Wind gusts up to  caused several buildings in Cairns and Kuranda to lose their roofs. Hundreds of trees were uprooted and powerlines were brought down throughout the district, disrupting supplies to more than 40,000 residents. In Cairns, a giant fig tree was uprooted with the entire root system out of the ground. Crop damage by floods and winds was severe, with the sugar cane damage alone estimated at  million. Early estimates indicate that the total damage bill in north Queensland associated with Cyclone Steve may exceed  million.

Northern Territory
Severe winds squalls and heavy rainfall was recorded across the Top End. Gusts near  in Darwin overnight on 2 March brought down trees. Widespread flooding resulted in the Katherine, Daly and Victoria River regions. Similar totals were recorded over four days in the Kimberley region. Numerous Northern Territory roads and highways were cut with many communities isolated.

Western Australia

Near gale-force winds were experienced at Port Hedland for a period of about 17 hours beginning at midnight AWST on 5 March.

The very heavy rainfall associated with Steve produced widespread flooding in northern parts of the state, including the Gascoyne region. Communities in the Kimberley region which remained isolated for more than two weeks required food and supply air-drops. Low-lying areas of the Carnarvon townsite were flooded when the Gascoyne River breached its banks. The Gascoyne River at Carnarvon reached its highest level since 1960.

Parts of the western Pilbara and northern Gascoyne received totals that ranged from 200 to 300 mm. Several sites reported highest on record daily rainfall amounts including Mandora (281.0 mm on 6th) and Mount Narryer (152.0 mm on 10th). Carnarvon (100.6 mm on 9th) reported its highest March daily rainfall since records commenced at the airport in 1945. Rainfall ranging from 50 to 100 mm continued over inland parts extending in a south-easterly direction from the west Gascoyne to the south coast near Esperance. Flooding occurred in the Esperance area and number of roads and bridges were washed away. Salmon Gums Research Station recorded 91 mm of rain on 11 March.

Retirement
The name Steve was removed from the official list of tropical cyclone names set out by the Tropical Cyclone Warning Centre in Brisbane. It was replaced with the name Stan.

See also

 List of tropical cyclones

References

External links

 Bureau of Meteorology Report on Cyclone Steve
 Track of Cyclone Steve from Unisys

1999–2000 Australian region cyclone season
Cyclone Steve
Retired Australian region cyclones
Category 2 Australian region cyclones
2000s in Western Australia
Steve
Tropical cyclones in Western Australia
Tropical cyclones in Queensland
Tropical cyclones in the Northern Territory